Hajji Ahmad Shah Khan Asakzai احمد شاه خان اچکزی was elected to represent Kandahar Province in Afghanistan's Wolesi Jirga, the lower house of its National Legislature, in 2005.
A report on Kandahar prepared at the Navy Postgraduate School stated 
he is from the Pashtun ethnic group.
He is a tribal elder from Spin Boldak, who sits on the Armed Service Committee.

References

Politicians of Kandahar Province
Living people
Members of the House of the People (Afghanistan)
Year of birth missing (living people)